Polladhavan is a 2007 Indian Tamil-language action thriller film written and directed by Vetrimaran in his directorial debut. Starring Dhanush and Divya Spandana, the film revolves around a man whose life improves after buying a bike, and turns upside down after it is stolen. Three songs and the background score were composed by G. V. Prakash Kumar, while Yogi B and Dhina composed each one song. Velraj was the director of cinematography, V. T. Vijayan edited the film and Rambo Rajkumar choreographed the stunts. The film was released on 8 November 2007. Receiving a tremendously positive response, it popularized the Bajaj Pulsar among the youth. The film was remade in a number of languages, owing to its success.

Plot
Prabhu Shankar is a happy-go-lucky middle-class man who spends time playing carrom in the streets with his friends Sathish and Kumar and others. He and his father keep falling into minor misunderstandings, and falls in love with a girl named Hema, who he meets at a bus stop. When he is caught in the act of stealing a pittance from his father for booze with his friends during one of his friends's sister's marriage, Prabhu questions his father's responsibility towards his upbringing, as a result, his father gives Prabhu some of his savings and tells him to do something with his life. Prabhu purchases a Bajaj Pulsar bike with the money. 

While his family initially berate him for buying the bike, he soon secures a job at a bank due to his bike, earning their respect. He forms an interminable attachment with his bike since it became his streak of luck, from getting a job to Hema eventually reciprocating his feelings. The bike eventually saves his life from a freak incident and gets lost during an outing with Hema, subjecting Prabhu to unfathomable anguish as he searches for his bike with his friends. When his family members asks him about his bike, he tells them that he had given it for dealer service. Prabhu comes into conflict with the underworld when he witnesses a brutal murder planned by a gang in Kasimedu in North Chennai by a smuggling don named Selvam and his accomplices.

Prabhu finds out that his bike was stolen by a petty bike thief who turns out to be in connection with Selvam's egoistical younger brother Ravi. Prabhu traces down the culprit and hands him over to the local police station. A formal complaint is lodged on the culprit on the same night. Later that night, Prabhu confesses to his family that his bike was stolen. His family is very upset, but Prabhu's father assures them that the bike will be found in no time, having developed a feeling of respect for Prabhu after he had become responsible by going for a job. The next morning, Ravi visits Prabhu's locality and threatens him to withdraw the complaint against the culprit. When Prabhu refuses, Ravi pushes Prabhu's father during the argument, which prompts Prabhu to hit Ravi. 

Ravi's accomplices arrive at the scene, and Prabhu manages to fight them all, leaving Ravi beaten and embarrassed among the public. Selvam returns home in bail after a murder charge. When he finds out what happened to Ravi, he gets furious and sends his henchmen to attack Prabhu without knowing the reason for his brother's embarrassment. Prabhu, along with Kumar, meets Selvam at his own residence in Kasimedu. Ravi is not home at that time. Prabhu tells the truth to Selvam, but the latter refuses to believe that Ravi and his men stole his bike. After hearing from his close ally Out, Selvam believes Prabhu, apologizing and promises Prabhu that he will do whatever he can to get his bike back, but it was too late for Prabhu's father, who receives the attack from Ravi's men. He was admitted in a hospital, and Prabhu breaks down after knowing that his father may never walk again after his right leg is paralysed by the attack. 

Selvam, Ravi, and their men visit Prabhu to condole and apologize for what happened this time. Prabhu turns down the apology, and again, an immediate fight is about to break between Prabhu and Ravi before Selvam separates them both, blaming Ravi for the ordeal caused. The attack on his father makes Prabhu realize how much he loves his father and swears to protect his family at any cost. Although he wants to stay away, Prabhu invariably gets dragged into rubbing shoulders, caused by Ravi's antics, who now targets his family to seek revenge. Prabhu's bike is caught by the NCB and they nab him, suspecting him of drug smuggling in his bike. They release him after Prabhu tells them that his bike was stolen and shows them his FIR copy, but he does not tell them about Ravi or Selvam. 

Prabhu learns that his bike was stolen by Selvam's men to escape from a murder scene, but it was Ravi who smuggled drugs in his bike's petrol tank. Prabhu loses his job as an employee in his workplace since his bike was a source of transportation, and as he was kept at police custody for one night. Prabhu also gets despair from Hema's father (Boys Rajan) for being involved unwillingly with Selvam's men. Meanwhile, Ravi makes one more attempt at Prabhu's life, but he is snubbed again by Prabhu. Selvam becomes unhappy about this and warns him to quit smuggling if he ever gets in Prabhu's business anymore. Ravi accuses Selvam of being a non-caring brother, and Out intervenes and warns Ravi to mind his language. Surprisingly, Selvam himself comes in support of his brother to lash out at Out. 

Out separates briefly from Selvam after this conflict. The next day, Selvam and Ravi get attacked by unknown gangsters when they are traveling in their car outside the city. Selvam asks his brother to stay inside the car and handles the killers on his own. He gets brutally injured only to find out that he has been stabbed by his own brother Ravi. The attack was arranged by Ravi himself to kill Selvam. Ravi delivers the killer blow before telling that Selvam is too complacent of Prabhu and he is going to kill him, after which Selvam dies. Ravi creates a scene among Selvam's family and henchmen. Out, who is not aware of the mastermind behind the assault on Selvam. 

Out gets furious and vows to kill every enemy of his mentor Selvam, including Prabhu. Prabhu eventually gets his bike back, but is disheartened when he finds it vandalized, so he takes it to the service centre for restoration. While there, he learns that Ravi is after him and his family. He first goes to save Hema. After securing her, he goes to save his family. He thinks that the only way to stop this is to confront Ravi himself. He takes down all the men sent by Ravi, who comes in his way. 

Meanwhile, Prabhu's family are chased down in Kumar's auto rickshaw by Ravi's men. Prabhu finds Ravi hiding in an ice factory and engages in a fight with him. Prabhu overpowers Ravi during the fight; the latter tries to escape from him but finds the shutter of the ice factory blocked. Prabhu manages to subdue Ravi under the knife, threatening him to ask his men to leave Prabhu's family, which he does, and his men spare Prabhu's family and Kumar. 

When Prabhu is about to leave, Ravi provokes him to continue the fight until death. Prabhu manages to dodge Ravi's swing of his knife and gets a steel rod to fatally knock him down. Out arrives at the scene after having learnt that it was Ravi who orchestrated Selvam's death, hence he was the one who had blocked the shutter of the ice factory as Ravi tried to flee. Out smiles at Prabhu and lets him go while he stares down at Ravi's corpse, satisfied that Prabhu had done his job for him, avenging Selvam's death and remembering his words of Prabhu: "He is fearless and should be spared." Prabhu leaves the scene in his beloved Pulsar bike.

Cast

Dhanush as Prabhu Shankar 
Divya Spandana as Hema
Daniel Balaji as Ravi
Kishore as Selvam
Murali as Shankar, Prabhu's father
Bhanupriya as Thilaga, Prabhu's mother
Santhanam as Sathish
Karunas as Kumar
Pawan as Out
Boys Rajan as Hema's father
Chetan as Prabhu's manager
Akila as Uma, Prabhu's sister
Sendrayan as Bike Thief
Anju as Selvam's wife
Manobala as Bike Showroom Manager
Daniel Annie Pope as Prabhu's friend
Munnar Ramesh as Police Inspector
Poonam Bajwa in a special appearance
Brinda Parekh in the song "Alibaba Thangam"
Yogi B in the song "Engeyum Eppothum"

Production
Vetrimaaran, who earlier worked as an assistant to Balu Mahendra, prepared a script for Dhanush, who was the lead hero of the films he worked in, and Dhanush immediately accepted the offer after hearing the story. The film titled Desiya Nedunchalai 47 was initially launched with Yuvan Shankar Raja as the music director and Ekambaram as the cinematographer. After he found trouble finding producers with A. M. Rathnam and Salem Chandrasekhar leaving the project after initial interest, Dhanush's sister Dr. Vimala Geetha agreed to produce the film, but she also dropped the film. Dhanush's father Kasthuri Raja finally agreed to produce the film, and Kirat Bhattal was signed as heroine, while Harris Jayaraj was selected as music director. However, after two days of shoot, the film was shelved, and Dhanush opted to pursue other films after the surprise success of his Thiruvilayadal Arambam. The film's collapse saw Vetrimaaran approach producer Kadiresan and narrated to him the stories he had prepared, but the producer did not like Desiya Nedunchaalai 47, but agreed to work on another project titled Polladhavan.

Vetrimaaran has since described that he had "ample time" for his production works of Polladhavan as "Dhanush had confidence in him". Production designer Durai helped him rope in Deva to score the film's music, while Dhanush also recommended cinematographer Velraj to Vetrimaaran after the pair had worked together in Parattai Engira Azhagu Sundaram. Vetrimaaran chose Kannada language actor Kishore to make his Tamil film debut after his assistant gave him rave reviews of the actor's performance in the unfinished Prashanth-starrer Petrol. The team held test shoots with both Kajal Aggarwal and Poonam Bajwa for the film and released the stills to the media, but Vetrimaaran was still unsatisfied and finished two schedules before finalising on Divya Spandana. The director revealed that there was initially an issue with the actress after she got offended by his words and did not come for the shoot for three days, before Durai intervened. The film's story was inspired partly by the lost bike of his friend Andrew and the variety of experiences he had tracking down his vehicle. Vetrimaaran revealed that when he wrote the script, he made many changes to suit the visual medium and for Dhanush on his physical attributes while playing an action hero. When questioned about its relevance to Bicycle Thieves, he stated that it "is a disgrace to Bicycle Thieves if it is compared with Polladhavan".

Critical reception
The critic from Sify.com stating that "Vetri has made his mentor proud, and his style of narration and takings are very similar to the ace director "Balu Mahendra". The reviewer from The Hindu stated that "at no point does Polladhavan sag and that writer-director Vetrimaran has slogged through his screenplay and the result shows." Nowrunning wrote:"'Polladavan' is a typical Dhanush flick, which is not even distantly related to Rajinikanth's "Polladavan." The script is obviously tailor-made for Dhanush but it is no different from gangster movies, which make audiences feel jaded".

Awards
The movie received four Vijay Awards, including one for Best Director.

Remakes
Polladhavan was remade in Kannada as Punda and in Telugu as Kurradu starring Varun Sandesh but it could not repeat the success of the original version. It was remade in Sinhala as Pravegeya.This film was also remade in Bengali film Borbaad (2014) directed by Raj Chakraborty with debutant Bonny Senguta and Rittika sen and in Hindi as Guns of Banaras (2020).

Soundtrack

The soundtrack consisted of five songs, three of them composed by G. V. Prakash Kumar, while rapper Yogi B and Dhina composed each one track. The song Engeyum Eppodhum is a remix of the same-titled song from the 1979 film Ninaithale Inikkum. Responding to allegations that the song Minnalgall Koothadum was a rip-off of Akon's Smack That, Prakash Kumar stated "I may have been inspired, but I did not just copy that song".

References

External links

2007 films
Indian action thriller films
Films about organised crime in India
Tamil films remade in other languages
Films about automobiles
Films about theft
Films about brothers
Films scored by G. V. Prakash Kumar
Films set in Chennai
Films shot in Chennai
2000s Tamil-language films
2007 directorial debut films
2007 action thriller films
Films directed by Vetrimaaran